Suburban Collection Showplace is a convention center and exposition center in Novi, Michigan, which forms part of Metro Detroit. Suburban Collection Showplace is owned by TBON, LLC., a corporation located in Novi, but was originally owned by Blair Bowman, a lawyer. The complex hosts the Michigan State Fair and has done so since 2012.

History
It opened in 2005 as the Rock Financial Showplace, and was built for $18 million. Bowman had previously owned another convention center, the Novi Expo Center, which he had bought and renovated as a convention center in 1991.

The original naming deal was with Quicken Loans, which was previously known as "Rock Financial." Quicken later expressed more interest in using its current name, which was nationally known, instead of "Rock Financial," which was only known around Metro Detroit. Bowman instead terminated the original naming deal. The center was renamed in 2010 after an automobile dealership group headquartered in Troy.

Currently the center has  of exhibition and convention space. The center originally had  of space, making it the third-largest convention center in Southeast Michigan and METRO Detroit. To accommodate the state fair's anticipated growth, Bowman made several land purchases since 2012, totaling  of space, including a plot of land across Grand River Avenue and a  lot to the west.

Contents
The Diamond Banquet and Conference Center is on the property. Hyatt Place Detroit/Novi, the convention center's hotel, is also owned by Bowman. The six story hotel is in the eastern side of the property and is connected to the rest of the complex through a  extension of the banquet and conference center. The hotel officially opened in 2013.

References

External links
 Suburban Collection Showplace
 Articles about the Rock Financial Showplace - CBS Detroit

 NATC Exhibitor Invitation

Buildings and structures in Oakland County, Michigan
Convention centers in Michigan
2005 establishments in Michigan
Event venues established in 2005
Tourist attractions in Oakland County, Michigan
Novi, Michigan